Bloomin' Marvellous is a 1997 BBC comedy series starring Clive Mantle, Sarah Lancashire, and Kathryn Hunt. Written by playwright John Godber, it is described as "a comedy about a couple who decide to start a family." The series was panned by most critics, and Mantle sarcastically remarked that "I've seen murderers and rapists get a better press than we did."

References

External links
 

1997 British television series debuts
1997 British television series endings
British comedy television shows
BBC television comedy